Pierre-Hugues Herbert and Albano Olivetti were the defending champions, but chose not to participate.

Flavio Cipolla and Dominik Meffert won the title, defeating Martin Emmrich and Andreas Siljeström in the final, 3–6, 7–6(7–5), [10–8].

Seeds

Draw

References
 Main Draw

Open BNP Paribas Banque de Bretagne - Doubles
2015 Doubles